Kuninkoja is a ward ( in Finnish,  in Swedish) of Turku, Finland, also known as Ward 7. The ward is located to the northwest of the city centre and named after the historical area of the city that it occupies. There is also a district called Kuninkoja in the neighbouring municipality of Raisio.

The ward has a population of 16,288 and an annual population increase of 0.39%. 13.29% of the ward's population are under 15 years old, while 21.81% are over 65. The ward's linguistic makeup is 94.82% Finnish, 3.09% Swedish, and 2.08% other.

Districts
The ward consists of seven districts. Four of them are divided with other wards.

Notes
Note 1:  The districts of Kähäri and Vätti are divided between Ward 1 (City Centre) and Ward 7.
Note 2:  The district of Pitkämäki is divided between Ward 1 (City Centre), Ward 7 and Ward 8 (Naantalintie).
Note 3:  The district of Runosmäki is divided between Ward 6 (Tampereentie) and Ward 7.

See also 
Districts of Turku
Wards of Turku

Wards of Turku